A Van der Waals molecule is a weakly bound complex of atoms or molecules held together by intermolecular attractions such as Van der Waals forces or by hydrogen bonds. 
The name originated in the beginning of the 1970s when stable molecular clusters were regularly observed in molecular beam microwave spectroscopy.

Examples 

Examples of well-studied vdW molecules are Ar2, H2-Ar, H2O-Ar, benzene-Ar, (H2O)2, and (HF)2. 
Others include the largest diatomic molecule: He2 and LiHe.

Supersonic beam spectroscopy 

In (supersonic) molecular beams  temperatures are very low (usually less than 5 K). At these low temperatures Van der Waals (vdW) molecules are stable and can be investigated by microwave, far-infrared spectroscopy and other modes of spectroscopy. 
Also in cold equilibrium gases vdW molecules are formed, albeit in small, temperature dependent concentrations. Rotational and vibrational transitions in vdW molecules have been observed in gases, mainly by UV and IR spectroscopy.

Van der Waals molecules are usually very non-rigid and different versions are separated by low energy barriers, so that tunneling splittings, observable in  far-infrared spectra, are relatively large. 
Thus, in the far-infrared one may observe intermolecular vibrations, rotations, and tunneling motions of Van der Waals molecules. 
The VRT spectroscopic study of Van der Waals molecules is one of the most direct routes to the understanding of intermolecular forces.

See also 

 Van der Waals radius
 Van der Waals strain
 Van der Waals surface
 –articles about specific chemicals
 Researchers active in this field:
 Donald Levy
 Richard J. Saykally
 Richard Smalley 
 William Klemperer

References

Further reading 

 So far three special issues of Chemical Reviews have been devoted to vdW molecules: I. Vol. 88(6) (1988). II. Vol. 94(7) (1994). III. Vol. 100(11) (2000).
 Early reviews of vdW molecules: G. E. Ewing, Accounts of Chemical Research, Vol. 8, pp. 185-192, (1975): Structure and Properties of Van der Waals molecules. B. L. Blaney and G. E. Ewing, Annual Review of Physical Chemistry, Vol. 27, pp. 553-586 (1976): Van der Waals Molecules.
 About VRT spectroscopy: G. A. Blake, et al., Review Scientific Instruments, Vol. 62, p. 1693, 1701 (1991). H. Linnartz, W.L. Meerts, and M. Havenith, Chemical Physics, Vol. 193, p. 327 (1995).

Physical chemistry
 
Molecule